Andrew James Granville (born 7 September 1962) is a British mathematician, working in the field of number theory.

He has been a faculty member at the Université de Montréal since 2002. Before moving to Montreal he was a mathematics professor at the University of Georgia (UGA) from 1991 until 2002. He was a section speaker in the 1994 International Congress of Mathematicians together with Carl Pomerance from UGA.

Granville received his Bachelor of Arts (Honours) (1983) and his Certificate of Advanced Studies (Distinction) (1984) from Trinity College, Cambridge University. He received his PhD from Queen's University in 1987 and was inducted into the Royal Society of Canada in 2006.

Granville's work is mainly in number theory, in particular analytic number theory. Along with Carl Pomerance and W. R. (Red) Alford he proved the infinitude of Carmichael numbers in 1994. This proof was based on a conjecture given by Paul Erdős.

Granville won a Lester R. Ford Award in 2007 and again in 2009. In 2008, he won the Chauvenet Prize for expository writing from the Mathematical Association of America for his paper "It is easy to determine whether a given integer is prime". In 2012 he became a fellow of the American Mathematical Society.

Andrew Granville, in collaboration with Jennifer Granville, has written "Prime Suspects: The Anatomy of Integers and Permutations", a graphic novel that investigates key concepts in Mathematics.

References

External links
Professor Granville's Université de Montréal page
Videos of Andrew Granville in the AV-Portal of the German National Library of Science and Technology

1962 births
Living people
20th-century British mathematicians
21st-century British mathematicians
Number theorists
Academic staff of the Université de Montréal
University of Georgia faculty
Queen's University at Kingston alumni
Alumni of Trinity College, Cambridge
Fellows of the Royal Society of Canada
Fellows of the American Mathematical Society
Royal Society Wolfson Research Merit Award holders
British expatriate academics in Canada